The 1939 Tschammerpokal Final decided the winner of the 1939 Tschammerpokal, the 5th season of Germany's knockout football cup competition. It was played on 28 April 1940 at the Olympiastadion in Berlin. 1. FC Nürnberg won the match 2–0 against Waldhof Mannheim, to claim their 2nd cup title.

Route to the final
The Tschammerpokal began the final stage with 64 teams in a single-elimination knockout cup competition. There were a total of five rounds leading up to the final. Teams were drawn against each other, and the winner after 90 minutes would advance. If still tied, 30 minutes of extra time was played. If the score was still level, a replay would take place at the original away team's stadium. If still level after 90 minutes, 30 minutes of extra time was played. If the score was still level, a second replay would take place at the original home team's stadium. If still level after 90 minutes, 30 minutes of extra time was played. If the score was still level, a drawing of lots would decide who would advance to the next round.

Note: In all results below, the score of the finalist is given first (H: home; A: away).

Match

Details

References

External links
 Match report at kicker.de 
 Match report at WorldFootball.net
 Match report at Fussballdaten.de 

1. FC Nürnberg matches
SV Waldhof Mannheim matches
Tschammerpokal Final
1939
Football competitions in Berlin
1940s in Berlin
April 1940 sports events